Sweden was present at the Eurovision Song Contest 1986, held in Bergen, Norway.

The Swedish national final, Melodifestivalen 1986, was held on 22 March at the Cirkus in Stockholm, and was broadcast across Sweden on SVT1. The winners were Lasse Holm and Monica Törnell with their song "E' de' det här du kallar kärlek?".

Before Eurovision

Qualifying competition
Melodifestivalen 1986 was the contest for the 26th song to represent Sweden at the Eurovision Song Contest. 90 songs had been submitted to SVT for the competition; 10 of these were performed at the contest, which was held at Cirkus in Stockholm on 22 March 1986. It was presented by Lennart Swahn and Tommy Engstrand and was broadcast on TV1. No orchestra was used, and instead the ten songs were broadcast as music videos. The five songs that qualified for the second round were performed live to backing track.

Voting

At Eurovision

Voting

References

External links
TV broadcastings at SVT's open archive

1986
Countries in the Eurovision Song Contest 1986
1986
Eurovision
Eurovision